Novodesyatnikovo is a rural locality (a selo) in Kyakhtinsky District, Republic of Buryatia, Russia. The population was 270 as of 2010. There are 4 streets.

Geography 
Novodesyatnikovo is located 64 km northeast of Kyakhta (the district's administrative centre) by road. Kharyasta is the nearest rural locality.

References 

Rural localities in Kyakhtinsky District